Cinéfranco is an annual film festival in Toronto, Ontario, Canada, which presents a weeklong program of both Canadian and international French language films.

History
The festival was established in 1997 by Marcelle Lean, a former chair of the Ontario Film Development Corporation, and was staged for the first time in February 1998. Lean remained the event's executive director as of 2015.

Unlike larger events such as the Toronto International Film Festival, all films throughout the week were screened in a single theatre venue. To establish broader audience appeal beyond the city's francophone community alone, all films were screened with English language subtitles.

Separately from the main festival, an annual youth program of films for children and teenagers is also staged each year. The separate youth program was launched for the first time in 2007.

The festival presented an annual award, the Radio-Canada Audience Award, to the film voted by festival attendees as the best film in that year's program. TFO also formerly sponsored an award for the most popular film in the youth program.

In 2015, Lean told L'Express de Toronto that the festival was in financial trouble and may be forced to cease operations if it could not renegotiate its operational support and sponsorship agreements. The main festival was initially cancelled in 2016, although the youth program was still staged; instead, Tournée Québec Cinéma, a program of Québec Cinéma which presents a touring minifestival of Quebec films in various locations across Canada, added an event in Toronto to its schedule. The event was later revived, however, with a smaller-scale Cinéfranco presented in October 2016 at the Alliance Française de Toronto.

Audience Award
 2009: Paris, Cédric Klapisch
 2010: Female Agents (Les Femmes de l'ombre), Jean-Paul Salomé
 2011: Bacon on the Side (Il reste du jambon?), Anne Depétrini
 2012: Free Men (Les Hommes libres), Ismaël Ferroukhi
 2013: What's in a Name? (Le Prénom), Matthieu Delaporte and Alexandre de La Patellière 
 2014: The Gilded Cage (La Cage dorée), Ruben Alves
 2015: Once in a Lifetime (Les Héritiers), Marie-Castille Mention-Schaar
 2016-2017: no award presented
 2018: 1991, Ricardo Trogi

TFO Prize for Best Youth Film
2009: The Necessities of Life (Ce qu'il faut pour vivre), Benoît Pilon
2010: Little Nicholas (Le Petit Nicolas), Laurent Tirard
2011: Trouble at Timpetill (Les Enfants de Timpelbach), Nicolas Bary
2012: War of the Buttons, Yann Samuel

References

External links
Cinéfranco

Film festivals in Toronto
1997 establishments in Ontario
Film festivals established in 1997
Franco-Ontarian organizations
Children's film festivals in Canada